Mieszko Gniezno is a football club based in Gniezno (Poland). They currently play in IV liga , the fifth tier of Polish league football. The club's name commemorates Polish ruler Mieszko I of Poland, who ruled Poland in the 10th century, when Gniezno was capital of Poland.

History
In 1989, Mieszko's senior team achieved the greatest success in the club's history, reaching the quarter-finals of the Polish Cup at the central level. After eliminating teams such as Gwardia Warszawa, Śląsk Wrocław and Szombierki Bytom, Mieszko had to face Legia Warsaw. There were no shocks however, in Gniezno despite the support of over 15,000 fans Mieszko lost 0–5, and in Warsaw, they lost 1–5 (an honorary goal by Tomasz Kurowski).

On 17 June 2018 after winning the playoff match against Victoria Września (both matches won 2–1 and 4–1 respectively), the team was promoted to the fourth division. From the 2018–19 season Mieszko played in the 2nd group of the fourth division.

The club finished 5th consecutively between the 2018–19 and 2019–20 season. However despite the two previous good seasons, in the 2020–21 season Mieszko finished bottom meaning they were again relegated to the 5th division once again. The following season the team failed to get promoted finishing 5th, thirteen points off of 1st place.

Honours

 1/4 Polish Cup: 1989–90
 Winners IV liga Greater Poland North Group: 2017–18
 Winners Klasa Okręgowa Poznań (East) Group: 2016–17
 Winners IV liga Greater Poland North Group: 2002–03
 Winners Klasa Okręgowa Poznań Group: 2000–01

References

External links
 Official club website

Association football clubs established in 1974
1974 establishments in Poland
Gniezno
Football clubs in Greater Poland Voivodeship